Kazhugu is a 1981 Indian Tamil-language action film directed by S. P. Muthuraman, starring Rajinikanth, Rati Agnihotri and Sumalatha. Upon release, the unconventional story, which revolved around hypnotism and human sacrifice did not go well with the audience and Kazhugu failed in the box office. However it became a cult film among Rajinikanth fans in the 1980s. It is an adaptation of the 1975 American film Race with the Devil.

Plot 
Satyamoorthy is a wealthy diamond business man and a widower living with his younger brother Raja (Rajinikanth) and two daughters Radha and Chitra. Satyamoorthy is a great devotee of saints and priests trusting all of them to be genuine whereas Raja is a happy go lucky guy just opposite to his brother who does not trust any of them. Satyamoorthy once invites a priest to his home to perform rituals to drive away all evil surrounding his house not knowing that the priest is a fake and member of a robber gang.  Satyamoorthy takes him to his treasury room where he had stored his huge wealth and tells him the secret of unlocking his lockers.  The fake priest pretends to give a sacred sheet and instructs to place it inside the locker which shall protect the stuffs. As Raja suspected, the priest sends the robbers at night to loot the wealth but Raja wakes up and fights with them and restores the looted property. Raja's repeated attempts to prove that the priest is fake goes vain as Satyamoorthy believes strongly that Raja protected the wealth only because of the divine power of the sacred sheet.

Raja once enters a ladies toilet by mistake and is caught by a girl who screams that Raja has come to misbehave. Raja wants to revenge for her behaviour with him and goes to her father Sivaraman and lies that he is the lover of his daughter Hemavathy (Rati Agnihotri) aka Hema. Sivaraman believes him and stops all of the Hema's outing. Hema gets angry and goes to Raja to reveal the truth to her father. Hema explains that once a man came into the ladies toilet and tried to rape her and that is the reason for the behaviour with him that day. Understanding Hema's situation Raja tells the truth to Sivaraman. This brings Raja and Hema together and both fall in love and marry.

As their marriage gift, Satyamoorthy gifts his brother a recreational vehicle for his honeymoon. Raja and Hema set for their honeymoon with Raja's friends. After some days, Raja and his crew set a camp in a place near a small village. They get help and assistance from an innocent village girl Vasanthi (Vanitha Krishnachandran), a vegetable seller. Fews days later at a night Raja's group hears a drum sound. Raja and his friend follows the sound which ends in a sacrificial ground and sacrifice of Vasanthi by a group of people. Raja screams on seeing Vasanthi being beheaded and alerts the men. They were chased by the men and Raja escapes with his group from them. Next day Raja goes to police station and gives complaint of the incident. On police investigation, Raja is shocked to hear there was no evidence of the existence of the girl Vasanthi.

Raja's men were further tortured by those men and Raja loses one of his friend. Raja gets into deep investigation and end up at a place of a Rajarishi (Sangili Murugan) who is believed to be great saint. Raja meets his brother and his father-in-law on their to visit of Rajarishi and Raja goes with them.  Raja finds that Rajarishi is not a saint but a grand looter and head of the robbery gang who make wealthy people handover the property to him by giving a sacred drink called 'Anandha Rasam' which is actually alcohol mixed stuff. Satyamoorthy's daughter Radha is declared dead by a snake bite. But the girl has not died and made to believe that she has died as she is wanted by Rajarishi for a human sacrificial ritual.  Raja follows the Rajarishi's men and finds his niece in an unconscious state obeying whatever Rajarishi say. When Rajarishi is about to behead her Raja rescues her and runs away from the place. Raja is followed by the whole village and Raja escapes in his bus. Finally Raja gets into a great struggle with Rajarishi's men and reveals the truth to everybody. Police finally arrest Rajarishi and his men for their illegal crimes.

Cast 
Rajinikanth as Rajasekar
Rati Agnihotri as Hema
Sangili Murugan as Rajarishi
Thengai Srinivasan as Sathiyamoorthy
Y. G. Mahendran as Gopi
V. K. Ramasamy as Sivaraman
Suruli Rajan as Rajarishi's Sishyan
Cho Ramaswamy as Ramasamy
Sumalatha as Suma
Ramanathan as Raja's friend
Senthamarai as Inspector of police
S. V. Ramadas as Mahadevan
K. Kannan as Henchman of rajarishi
Vanitha Krishnachandran as Vasanthi
 S.L. Narayanan

Soundtrack 
The music was composed by Ilaiyaraaja, with lyrics by Panchu Arunachalam.

Release and reception 
Kazhugu was released on 6 March 1981. Kalki wrote . The film failed at the box office as the offbeat theme was not appreciated by fans of Rajinikanth. In the book Rajinikanth: The Definitive Biography, director S. P. Muthuraman is quoted as saying "We bought a bus and created a caravan that became a character in the film. It was a different film, but the audience really didn't understand it".

References

External links 
 

1980s Tamil-language films
1981 films
Films directed by S. P. Muthuraman
Films scored by Ilaiyaraaja
Films with screenplays by Panchu Arunachalam
Indian remakes of American films